Fernando Chaparro (born July 30, 1964) is an Argentine sprint canoer who competed in the late 1980s. He was eliminated in the repechages of the K-4 1000 m event at the 1988 Summer Olympics in Seoul. Four years later in Barcelona, Chaparro was eliminated in the repechages of the K-2 500 m event and the semifinals of the K-4 1000 m event.

References
Sports-reference.com profile

1964 births
Argentine male canoeists
Canoeists at the 1988 Summer Olympics
Canoeists at the 1992 Summer Olympics
Living people
Olympic canoeists of Argentina